Oliver Dene Jones (born 1 June 1986), known as Skream, is an English electronic music producer based in Croydon. Skream was an early and influential exponent of the dubstep genre. After producing several singles, he released his first full-length album, Skream!, in 2006.

Skream and longtime collaborators Artwork and Benga co-founded a music group called Magnetic Man. Their debut album, Magnetic Man was released in 2010.

In July 2011, Jones had his first child, a son.

Jones is the brother of jungle DJ Hijak.

Origins 
Jones was born in West Wickham, Bromley, London. As a teenager, he worked at Big Apple Records, a Croydon-based record store that was at the centre of the early dubstep scene; even prior to this, Jones had become acquainted with Hatcha, another dubstep pioneer, because Jones' brother worked on an adjacent floor in Big Apple Records. As a result of this encounter, Hatcha was the first DJ to play Skream dubplates.

He began producing music at the age of 15, (using FruityLoops) and later claimed to have roughly 8000 tracks in various stages of development. He reports that he was frequently truant when he was a teenager, and spent a considerable amount of time at Big Apple Records. On occasion he attended FWD, a club night that was first hosted at the Velvet Rooms, but which moved to Plastic People in Shoreditch.

Early career: 2005–2010
Skream's early productions were stark and sinister works he co-produced with another frequenter of Big Apple, Adegbenga Adejumo (Benga). Together, they produced several tracks that Big Apple Records published on two EPs: The Judgment in 2003, and Hydro in 2004.

One of his first solo singles, 2005's "Midnight Request Line," has been credited as a key factor in the evolution of a more melodic sound in the dubstep music. Justin Hampton of the LA Times called the track "dubstep's most recognizable crossover hit". and has been praised by producers as diverse as grime producer Wiley, and minimal techno producer Ricardo Villalobos. A writer for The Wire wrote that the song has "an epic change of key and tempo that recall[s] the classicist mannerisms of Derrick May."

As dubstep attracted the attention of mainstream media outlets such as The Guardian and Pitchfork Media, Jones' music started to diverge from the darker, UK garage-influenced sound of early dubstep artists such as Horsepower Productions, and to incorporate elements of dub and house music.

Skream has released records on several British record labels, such as Tempa, Tectonic, and Big Apple Records. He has co-produced a number of tracks with Niall Henshaw (aka Spectrum). He has performed throughout Europe, the US, Canada, Australia, and Japan, as well as the UK. From 2006, he hosted a weekly Rinse FM show called Stella Sessions. In 2010, Benga joined the broadcast, which was renamed The Skream and Benga Show.

In 2007, "Angry" and "Colourful" from Skream!, as well as an exclusive mix, were featured in the E4 teen drama Skins. This marked the first instance dubstep was featured on television. Skream was also featured on BBC Radio 1's Essential Mix that same year.

In September 2008, Harmless released Watch the Ride, an album mixed by Skream. On 2 October 2008 Skream featured in a fly-on-the-wall German TV show Durch die Nacht mit … alongside drum and bass artist Goldie. In this, Skream stated that he currently had writer's block, but he was working on music in other genres, also mentioning a possible Skream & Goldie collaboration.

Writing for The Guardian in 2009, music journalist Tim Jonze attributed the success of La Roux's single "In for the Kill" to Skream's remix, "Let's Get Ravey".

In the summer of 2010, Tempa Records released Skream's second album, Outside the Box. Spin magazine rated the album 7 out of 10.

Mainstream success and a change in sound: 2011–present
Jones has seen commercial success as part of Magnetic Man, a live electronic music project with fellow dubstep pioneers Benga and Artwork. Their debut album peaked at number 5 on the UK Albums Chart and its lead single, "I Need Air" reached number 10 on the UK Singles Chart.

In January 2011, he and Benga left Rinse to replace Alex Metric in his 'In New DJs We Trust' slot on BBC Radio 1. The duo was eventually given a weekly slot on Radio 1, which began in April 2012.

Jones has worked with many prominent pop artists. In addition to La Roux, he has produced for and collaborated with the likes of Kelis, Miles Kane, and Chromeo, as well as Katy B and John Legend as part of Magnetic Man.

In response to his success, Jones launched his Skreamizm tour to offer himself a change of pace from arena and festival performances, opting to play three-hour sets in small clubs. These shows saw a greater incorporation of disco, house, and techno in his sets. His recent productions have increasingly veered away from dubstep into these various genres, seen in tracks such as "Sticky," "Bang That" and "Kreepin'". He has addressed the change in direction on his Twitter and in interviews, noting that he was inspired to do more varied sets by the likes of Jackmaster. In March 2013, he contributed a house mix to Pete Tong's All Gone Miami 2013 on Defected Records, a leading house label that releases yearly compilations dedicated to Miami and Ibiza. Resident Advisor wrote that with the release, he gained "entry to one of the most established institutions in house music."

Discography

Solo albums 
 Skream! (2006)
 Watch The Ride (2008)
 Outside the Box (2010)

With Magnetic Man
 Magnetic Man (2010)

References

External links
 
 Skream's SoundCloud

1986 births
Living people
People from Croydon
People from West Wickham
English electronic musicians
English record producers
Dubstep musicians
DJs from London
BBC Radio 1 presenters
Remixers
UK garage musicians
Musicians from Kent
Owsla artists
Electronic dance music DJs